The 2022 Slovak Cup Final (known as the Slovnaft Cup for sponsorship reasons) was the final match of the 2021–22 Slovak Cup, the 53rd season of the top cup competition in Slovak football. The match was played at the Tehelné pole in Bratislava, on 8 May 2022, contested by ŠK Slovan Bratislava and FC Spartak Trnava. It was only the fifth time since the foundation of the competition in 1969 and the first time since 2010 that the biggest rivals in Slovak football met in the final.

Teams
In the following table, finals until 1993 were in the Czechoslovak era, since 1994 were in the Slovak era.

Road to the final
Note: In all results below, the score of the finalist is given first (H: home; A: away; N: neutral venue).

Match

Details

See also
2021–22 Slovak Cup
2022–23 UEFA Europa Conference League
Traditional derby

References

Slovak Cup Finals
2021–22 in Slovak football
ŠK Slovan Bratislava matches
FC Spartak Trnava matches